Cossack Brigade can refer to:
 a military brigade composed of Cossacks
 Free Cossack Brigade of Vadim Yakovlev
 Persian Cossack Brigade of Vsevolod Lyakhov (also known as Iranian Cossack Brigade)